The Law of the Playground is a British television series broadcast on Channel 4 produced by Zeppotron in which various British comedians and celebrities recollect the past times of childhood at school. Throughout the series many different aspects of school life are brought up such as bullies, punishment, games, etc.

Celebrities
The series included the following celebrities:

Kerry Godliman
Paddy McGuinness
Vic Reeves
Frankie Boyle
Christian O'Connell
Lucy Montgomery
Karen Taylor
Rhys Thomas
Alan Carr
Mark Dolan
Iain Lee
Olivia Lee
Lee Mack
David Mitchell
Alex Zane
David Baddiel
Josie D'Arby
Fay Ripley
Jamelia
Jason Byrne
Jason Manford
Kevin Bishop
Colin Murray
Myleene Klass
Tom Price
Richard Bacon
Robert Webb
Russell Howard
Sean Hughes
Thaila Zucchi
Dom Joly
Dominic Wood
Mathew Horne
June Sarpong
Jayne Middlemiss
Michael McIntyre
Barunka O'Shaughnessy
Rob Rouse
Rufus Hound
Shappi Khorsandi
Stephen K. Amos
Tara Palmer-Tomkinson
Natalie Casey
Paul Kaye
Debra Stephenson
Tom Allen
Dan Atkinson
Craig Hill
Justin Lee Collins

Episode list

Season 1 (2006)

Season 2 (2008)

External links

2006 British television series debuts
2008 British television series endings
Channel 4 original programming
Television series by Zeppotron